Walter Henry Jones (August 18, 1912 – July 19, 1982) was an American Republican Party politician who served as a New Jersey State Senator and was a candidate for Governor of New Jersey.

Early life
Jones was born August 18, 1912 in New York City, the son of Walter and Florence Jones. He is a 1934 graduate of Rutgers University and received his law degree from Rutgers Law School in 1937. He received a Master of Law degree from New York University in 1942. He maintained his own law practice with offices in Hackensack and Newark, and was an assistant professor of law at Rutgers Law School.

Assemblyman
Jones was elected to the New Jersey General Assembly in 1942, and served consecutive terms in through 1953. He served as the Assembly Majority Leader in 1945 and as Assembly Speaker in 1946. Governor Walter Edge appointed him to serve as on the State Administrative Reorganization Commission in 1945.

State Senator
Jones was elected to the New Jersey State Senate in 1953 and was re-elected in 1957. Jones led a Senate investigation into garbage collection rackets and battled with New York politicians on their requirement that New Jerseyans who commute to work in New York pay a New York state income tax. Jones also focused on issues related to commuter transit, an issue that affected many of his New York constituents.

Diplomatic Assignment
In 1954, U.S. Secretary of State John Foster Dulles appointed him to serve as a member of the Inter-Governmental Committee on European Migration. He held that post through 1955. In 1955, Jones surveyed European casualties in connection with he Refugee Relief Program.

Campaign for Governor
Jones sought the Republican nomination for Governor of New Jersey in 1961, and at the start of the campaign he was considered the front-runner. He lost a particularly bitter primary contest with former U.S. Secretary of Labor James P. Mitchell.  Mitchell beat Jones by 41,635 votes, 44%-35%.  Jones gave up his Senate seat to run for governor.

Republican Party Chairman
From 1963 to 1966, Jones served as chairman of the Bergen County Republican Organization.

Indictment
A federal grand jury indicted Jones in 1971 on charges that he covered up a $2.4 million bank fraud. He was acquitted of all charges in 1974.

Family
Jones married Alice Ferris Henshaw (1916–2012) on May 5, 1939. He had four children: Walter H. Jones, 3d (Born 1942); Graham Oscar Jones (Born 1944); Susan Henshaw Jones (Born 1947); and Deborah Jones (Born 1952). He lived in Norwood, New Jersey.

1961 Republican Primary for Governor

References

Republican Party New Jersey state senators
Speakers of the New Jersey General Assembly
Republican Party members of the New Jersey General Assembly
Rutgers University alumni
New York University School of Law alumni
People from Norwood, New Jersey
Politicians from New York City
New Jersey lawyers
1912 births
1982 deaths
20th-century American politicians
20th-century American lawyers